The 43rd annual Berlin International Film Festival was held from 11 to 22 February 1993. The Golden Bear was awarded to American-Taiwanese film The Wedding Banquet directed by Ang Lee and Chinese film Xiāng hún nǚ directed by Xie Fei. The retrospective dedicated to CinemaScope was shown at the festival.

Jury

The following people were announced as being on the jury for the festival:
 Frank Beyer, director and screenwriter (Germany) - Jury President
 Juan Antonio Bardem, director (Spain)
 Michel Boujut, writer, producer and film critic (France)
 François Duplat, producer (France)
 Katinka Faragó, producer (Sweden)
 Krystyna Janda, actress (Poland)
 Naum Kleiman, historian and film critic (Russia)
 Brock Peters, actor (United States)
 Susan Strasberg, actress (United States)
 Johanna ter Steege, actress (Netherlands)
 Zhang Yimou, director (China)

Films in competition
The following films were in competition for the Golden Bear and Silver Bear awards:

Key
{| class="wikitable" width="550" colspan="1"
| style="background:#FFDEAD;" align="center"| †
|Winner of the main award for best film in its section
|}

Awards

The following prizes were awarded by the Jury:
 Golden Bear:
 The Wedding Banquet by Ang Lee
 Xiāng hún nǚ by Xie Fei
 Silver Bear – Special Jury Prize: Arizona Dream by Emir Kusturica
 Silver Bear for Best Director: Andrew Birkin for The Cement Garden
 Silver Bear for Best Actress: Michelle Pfeiffer for Love Field
 Silver Bear for Best Actor: Denzel Washington for Malcolm X
 Silver Bear for an outstanding artistic contribution: Udzinarta mze by Temur Babluani
 Silver Bear: Samba Traoré by Idrissa Ouedraogo
 Honourable Mention:
 Ha-Chayim Al-Pi Agfa by Assi Dayan
 Wir können auch anders … by Detlev Buck
 Blue Angel Award: Le Jeune Werther by Jacques Doillon
 Honorary Golden Bear:
 Billy Wilder
 Gregory Peck
 Berlinale Camera:
 Victoria Abril
 Juliette Binoche
 Gong Li
 Corinna Harfouch
 Johanna ter Steege

References

External links
43rd Berlin International Film Festival 1993
1993 Berlin International Film Festival
Berlin International Film Festival:1993 at Internet Movie Database

43
1993 film festivals
1993 in Berlin
Berl
Berlin
February 1993 events in Europe